The BPost Bank Trophy 2014–2015 is a season long cyclo-cross competition which began on 12 October with the GP Mario De Clercq and will end on 7 February in Lille. In this season Oostmalle, that became an independent race this season, is replaced by Hamme, a former race in the Superprestige.

This edition follows the ranking system introduced the year before, using time instead of points.

Calendar

Ranking (top 10)

Results

Ronse

Oudenaarde

Hamme

Hasselt

Essen

Loenhout

Baal

Lille

References

Cyclo-cross BPost Bank Trophy
2014 in cyclo-cross
2015 in cyclo-cross